Penn & Teller: Bullshit! is an American documentary television series that aired for eight seasons from 2003 to 2010 on the premium cable channel Showtime. Penn & Teller: Bullshit! was hosted by professional magicians and skeptics Penn & Teller. Its format consists of debating political topics, often from a naturalist libertarian capitalist point of view (the political philosophy espoused by both Penn and Teller) or aiming to debunk pseudoscientific ideas, paranormal beliefs, popular fads and misconceptions. The hosts examine topics within the analytical structure of science.

The television program has been nominated for 21 awards, winning two. The Writers Guild of America bestowed an award upon the program in 2004 recognizing excellence in its writing quality. It received an award from the Independent Investigations Group in 2008, recognizing the show's contribution to public understanding of scientific skepticism and rational thinking. In addition, over the course of its run Penn & Teller: Bullshit! garnered a Directors Guild of America Award nomination, 13 Primetime Emmy Award nominations, and five Writers Guild of America Award nominations.

Directors Guild of America Awards 
The Directors Guild of America Awards are issued annually by the Directors Guild of America. Known as the DGA Awards, the recognition ceremony began in 1948.

Independent Investigations Group Awards 
The Independent Investigations Group is an organization dedicated to skepticism, and researching those who argue for the presence of extraordinary phenomena including  UFOs, paranormal assertions, ghosts, and psychics. A branch of the Center for Inquiry, the organization began in 2000 and is based in Los Angeles, California.

Primetime Emmy Awards 
The Primetime Emmy Award is an American accolade bestowed by the Academy of Television Arts & Sciences in recognition of excellence in American primetime television programming.

Writers Guild of America Awards 
The Writers Guild of America Awards for outstanding achievements in film, television, and radio have been presented annually by the Writers Guild of America, East and Writers Guild of America, West since 1949.

See also 

 List of books about skepticism
 List of fallacies
 List of Penn & Teller: Bullshit! episodes
 List of skeptics and skeptical organizations
 The Skeptic Encyclopedia of Pseudoscience

References

External links 
 

Lists of awards by television series
Scientific skepticism mass media
Libertarian television and radio shows